Hermann Albert Loos (21 July 1865-????) was a Ceylonese lawyer, judge and legislator. He was an unofficial member of the Legislative Council of Ceylon.

Born in Colombo to Frederick Charles Loos, member of the Legislative Counci and Jane Harriet Keith, he was educated privately before studying at the City of London School, University College, London and Gonville and Caius College, Cambridge graduating in 1887 and was called to the bar as a barrister at the Inner Temple. On his return to Ceylon he was admitted as an advocate of the Supreme Court and became private secretary to Justice Lovell Burchett Clarence. He started his own practice in the unofficial bar in 1890, and joined the Attorney Generals Department as Acting Office Assistant and Additional Crown Counsel. In 1899 he was appointed Additional Crown Counsel and in 1903 he was appointed Office Assistant and Crown Counsel. He served as District Judge of Colombo. He married Minnie Evelyn Gratiaen and they had seven children. 

He was elected as an unofficial member in the 1921 legislative council election and was nominated in 1924 as an unofficial member by the Governor to the Legislative Council of Ceylon.

The Hermann Loos Championship Trophy has been awarded annually since 1917 to the best performing cadet platoon of the National Cadet Corps at its annual camp at Diyathalawa.

References

20th-century Sri Lankan people
1865 births

Members of the Legislative Council of Ceylon
Puisne Justices of the Supreme Court of Ceylon
Burgher judges
Burgher politicians
Sri Lankan barristers
Ceylonese advocates
People educated at the City of London School
Alumni of University College London
Alumni of Gonville and Caius College, Cambridge
Members of the Inner Temple
Year of death missing